Centre of Mathematics and Design (MAyDI) was created at the Faculty of Architecture, Design and Urbanism of the University of Buenos Aires, in 1995, under the direction of Dr. Vera W. de Spinadel.

This Centre received several research and development grants from the Secretary of Science and Technology of the University of Buenos Aires. At the Scientific Renewable Programming 2004–2007, they received a stipendium for the creation of a Mathematics & Design Laboratory MyD_Lab. This Laboratory was officially inaugurated on April 15, 2005 and its main aim is to act as a technological pole of support, assessor ship and training in the subjects referred to the application of mathematical and informatical methodologies so as to state, develop and solve in an optimal way applied problems. The research lines in development are the following
Optimization of the Buenos Aires University Campus Habitat
Modeling in Inference Statistics
Planning, administration and control of projects
Study of urban morphologies using fractal geometry and complexity theory
Analysis of the interdisciplinarity of mathematics in relation to Design, Art and Science
Transference at the graduate and post-graduate level of multimedia material in the form of books, videos, web, seminar, “on line” courses, etc.

External links
Centre of Mathematics & Design (MAyDI)
Fractal Geometry

University of Buenos Aires